Dayton is a city in Hennepin and Wright counties in the U.S. state of Minnesota.  The population was 7,262 at the 2020 census. Dayton is mainly located within Hennepin County, but a part of the city extends into Wright County as well.  It is the northernmost city in Hennepin County and is a suburb of the Minneapolis–St. Paul "Twin Cities" metropolitan area.

The city of Dayton, platted in 1855, is named for city founder, Lyman Dayton. Through his energy and finances, Lyman Dayton was instrumental in bringing the railroad into Minnesota and development of the Lake Superior and Mississippi Railroad, of which he was president until 1865. The line is now part of the Burlington Northern Santa Fe Railroad.

Geography
On January 15, 2003, the city's most recent geographical expanse extended its boundaries.

Fernbrook Lane (County 121); North Diamond Lake Road (County 144); South Diamond Lake Road; and Dayton River Road (County 12) are four of the main routes in Dayton.  Interstate 94 and County Road 81 pass briefly through the southwest corner of Dayton.  Brockton Lane (County 13) runs north-south along Dayton's western boundary line with adjacent city of Rogers.

The neighboring cities are Champlin, Rogers, Maple Grove, Anoka, Ramsey, Elk River, and Otsego.  Corcoran is nearby, but does not border Dayton.

Dayton is located at the confluence of the Mississippi and Crow Rivers.

Economy
Dayton is a small town in regards to the economy scale with few retail outlets.  Dayton's economy comes from mostly small business operations such as Two golf courses, various car repair shops, famous local manor, and custom home builders.  Its one mall, Raintree Plaza, has Marathon gas station and convenience store as well as several other small businesses.

City government

In 2011, the city was forced to lay off several staff members and reduce services due to budget cuts.

Demographics

2010 census
As of the census of 2010, there were 4,671 people, 1,638 households, and 1,319 families living in the city. The racial makeup of the city was 93.7% White, 0.5% African American, 0.2% Native American, 2.0% Asian, 0.1% Pacific Islander, 1.8% from other races, and 1.7% from two or more races. Hispanic or Latino of any race were 8.8% of the population.

There were 1,638 households, of which 35.5% had children under the age of 18 living with them, 66.8% were married couples living together, 7.4% had a female householder with no husband present, 6.3% had a male householder with no wife present, and 19.5% were non-families. 14.3% of all households were made up of individuals, and 4.2% had someone living alone who was 65 years of age or older. The average household size was 2.85 and the average family size was 3.12.

The median age in the city was 41.7 years. 24.6% of residents were under the age of 18; 8.2% were between the ages of 18 and 24; 22.5% were from 25 to 44; 35.7% were from 45 to 64; and 9% were 65 years of age or older. The gender makeup of the city was 52.2% male and 47.8% female.

2000 census
As of the census of 2000, there were 4,699 people, 1,550 households, and 1,292 families living in the city. The racial makeup of the city was 95.28% White, 0.64% African American, 0.64% Native American, 0.81% Asian, 1.87% from other races, and 0.77% from two or more races. Hispanic or Latino of any race were 2.75% of the population. 31.6% were of German, 13.5% Swedish, 11.0% Norwegian and 7.9% Irish ancestry.

There were 1,550 households, out of which 45.7% had children under the age of 18 living with them, 71.9% were married couples living together, 7.9% had a female householder with no husband present, and 16.6% were non-families. 11.7% of all households were made up of individuals, and 2.1% had someone living alone who was 65 years of age or older.  The average household size was 3.03 and the average family size was 3.29.

In the city, the population was spread out, with 30.5% under the age of 18, 7.8% from 18 to 24, 33.2% from 25 to 44, 23.7% from 45 to 64, and 4.7% who were 65 years of age or older.  The median age was 35 years. For every 100 females, there were 103.1 males.  For every 100 females age 18 and over, there were 105.1 males.

The median income for a household in the city was $66,875, and the median income for a family was $71,356. Males had a median income of $41,476 versus $30,386 for females. The per capita income for the city was $27,756.  About 1.0% of families and 2.7% of the population were below the poverty line, including 3.7% of those under age 18 and none of those age 65 or over.

Politics
From 1960 to 1996, Dayton was a Democratic stronghold, having voted Democrat in every election except for 1984 when it voted narrowly for then incumbent Ronald Reagan, who won in a landslide over Minnesota Senator Walter Mondale. Since 2000 however, the city has drifted more and more Republican, having voted Republican in every election at the presidential level since 2000 when it voted by 12% for George W. Bush. The city was last won by Donald Trump in 2020.

Points of interest

St. John the Baptist Catholic Church, constructed in 1904, can be seen for miles and from four different counties.

References

External links
 City website

Cities in Hennepin County, Minnesota
Cities in Wright County, Minnesota
Cities in Minnesota
Minnesota populated places on the Mississippi River
Populated places established in 1855
1855 establishments in Minnesota Territory